Chilandrus is a genus of moths of the family Crambidae. It contains only one species, Chilandrus chrysistes, which is found in India (Madras).

References

 , 1970: New genera and species of tropical Crambinae (Studies of the Crambinae: Lepidoptera: Pyralidae: Part 48). Tijdschrift voor Entomologie 113 (1): 1-26.

Crambinae
Monotypic moth genera
Moths of Asia
Crambidae genera
Taxa named by Stanisław Błeszyński